Avon is a town in Washington Township, Hendricks County, Indiana, United States. The population was 21,474 at the 2020 census. It is part of the Indianapolis metropolitan area.

History
 
The first settlement at Avon was made around 1830. The first post office at Avon opened as "Smootsdell", in 1868. It was renamed "Avon" in 1870, and remained in operation until it was discontinued in 1902. The present name is after River Avon in England.

Geography
Avon is located in eastern Hendricks County at  (39.763160, −86.387900). It is bordered to the north by Brownsburg, to the west by Danville, the Hendricks County seat, to the south by Plainfield, and to the east by the city of Indianapolis in Marion County.

U.S. Route 36 is the main east–west road through the town, leading east  to downtown Indianapolis and west  to the center of Danville. Indiana State Road 267 formerly crossed US-36 in the center of Avon, leading north  to Brownsburg and south  to Plainfield, but that stretch of 267 was decommissioned in 2013, and the section through Avon is now officially called Avon Avenue.

Demographics

2010 census
As of the 2010 census, there were 12,446 people, 4,457 households, and 3,384 families living in the town. The racial makeup of the town was 86.7% White, 5.9% Black, 0.3% Native American, 3.3% Asian, 0.1% Pacific Islander, 1.4% from other races, and 2.2% from two or more races. Hispanic or Latino of any race were 4.3% of the population.

There were 4,457 households, of which 45.6% had children under the age of 18 living with them, 62.5% were married couples living together, 9.3% had a female householder with no husband present, 4.1% had a male householder with no wife present, and 24.1% were non-families. 19.4% of all households were made up of individuals, and 5.8% had someone living alone who was 65 years of age or older. The average household size was 2.77 and the average family size was 3.20.

The median age in the town was 33.9 years. 30.2% of residents were under the age of 18; 6.6% were between the ages of 18 and 24; 31.7% were from 25 to 44; 23.6% were from 45 to 64; and 8% were 65 years of age or older. The gender makeup of the town was 48.3% male and 51.7% female.

2000 census
As of the 2000 census, there were 6,248 people, 2,127 households, and 1,786 families living in the town. The racial makeup of the town was 95.87% White, 0.58% Black, 0.26% Native American, 1.41% Asian, 0.06% Pacific Islander, 0.72% from other races, and 1.10% from two or more races. Hispanic or Latino of any race were 1.36% of the population.

There were 2,127 households, out of which 51.4% had children under the age of 18 living with them, 75.4% were married couples living together, 5.6% had a female householder with no husband present, and 16.0% were non-families. 12.6% of all households were made up of individuals, and 3.6% had someone living alone who was 65 years of age or older. The average household size was 2.94 and the average family size was 3.22.

In the town, the population was spread out, with 33.2% under the age of 18, 4.8% from 18 to 24, 39.3% from 25 to 44, 18.1% from 45 to 64, and 4.5% who were 65 years of age or older. The median age was 32 years. For every 100 females, there were 101.7 males. For every 100 females age 18 and over, there were 99.0 males.

The median income for a household in the town was $66,782, and the median income for a family was $68,205. Males had a median income of $48,542 versus $31,010 for females. The per capita income for the town was $24,740. About 2.7% of families and 2.9% of the population were below the poverty line, including 2.9% of those under age 18 and 15.8% of those age 65 or over.

Education

Public schools
Avon's public school system is the Avon Community School Corporation. The mascot is the Avon Oriole.

Schools in the system include:
 High Schools (grades 9–12)
 Avon High School
 Harris Academy (shared with Brownsburg schools)
 Middle Schools (grades 7–8)
 Avon Middle School – North
 Avon Middle School – South
 Intermediate Schools (grades 5–6)
 Avon Intermediate School – East
 Avon Intermediate School – West
 Elementary Schools (grades K–4)
 Cedar Elementary School
 Hickory Elementary School
 Maple Elementary School
 Pine Tree Elementary School
 River Birch Elementary School
 Sycamore Elementary School
 White Oak Elementary School

Marching band
The Avon High School marching band is well known throughout the country. The Avon Marching Black and Gold, led by Jay Webb, Matt Harloff, Daniel Wiles, Karl Hartman, and Robert Burns, was ranked number one in the state of Indiana by the Indiana State School Music Association (ISSMA) seven years in a row (two times in Class B, five times in Class A). The winning streak ended during the ISSMA state championship on November 1, 2008 when they placed second. They again placed first in Class A on October 31, 2009 and on October 30, 2010, marking their ninth state championship in only ten years. On November 15, 2008, they were ranked as the best high school marching band in the country, placing first during Bands of America Grand Nationals for the first time in the school's history. The longest consecutive and uninterrupted national championship streak is three years, held by three schools: Marian Catholic High School (1987, 1988, 1989), Avon High School (2008, 2009, 2010) and Carmel High School (2016, 2017, 2018). In 2011, they placed 2nd.

Private schools
Private schools:
Kingsway Christian School (grades K–8)
Our Shepherd Lutheran School (grades PK–8)

Public library
Avon has a lending library, the Avon-Washington Township Public Library.

Notable people

Larry Dixon, 3-time NHRA Top Fuel Champion
Jay Drake, former race car driver
Chet Fillip, race car driver
Sergio Gomez, singer
Andrew Hines, 5-time NHRA Pro Stock Motorcycle Champion
William T. Hornaday, zoologist, savior of the bison
Leah Pritchett, NHRA Top Fuel driver
Patrick Rodgers, professional golfer
Jim Sorgi, Indianapolis Colts and New York Giants NFL quarterback
Steve Talley, actor
Miranda Throckmorton, sprint car driver
Al Unser Jr., former race car driver, two-time Indianapolis 500 winner
Bill Vukovich Jr., former race car driver
Brandon Peters, former college quarterback

Neighboring communities

References

External links

Town of Avon official website
Avon-Washington Township Public Library
Avon, Indiana Chamber of Commerce
Avon Community School Corporation

Towns in Hendricks County, Indiana
Towns in Indiana
Indianapolis metropolitan area